Haarala is a Finnish surname. Notable people with the surname include:

 Hanna Haarala, Finnish dancer
 Hannu Haarala (born 1981), Finnish footballer
 Santeri Haarala (born 1999), Finnish footballer

Finnish-language surnames